Czech Republic competed at the 2002 Winter Paralympics in Salt Lake City, United States. 6 competitors from Czech Republic won 5 medals including 2 gold, 1 silver and 2 bronze and finished 14th in the medal table.

See also 
 Czech Republic at the Paralympics
 Czech Republic at the 2002 Winter Olympics

References 

2002
2002 in Czech sport
Nations at the 2002 Winter Paralympics